The 2006 WNBA season was the 7th for the Indiana Fever. The Fever matched their record from 2005, but lost in the first round to eventual champion Detroit Shock.

Offseason
Deanna Jackson was selected by the Chicago Sky in the 2006 WNBA Expansion Draft.

WNBA Draft

Regular season

Season standings

Season schedule

Playoffs

Player stats

Awards and honors
Tamika Catchings, WNBA Defensive Player of the Year Award

References

External links
Fever on Basketball Reference

Indiana Fever seasons
Indiana
Indiana Fever